Matlock is an unincorporated community in Mason County, Washington, United States. Matlock is the primary population center for the western part of Mason County, a sporadically populated logging area. The most notable sites are the church, food bank, general store, post office, local grange hall, and the Mary M. Knight school, grades kindergarten through senior high school.

Matlock features nearby lakes and recreational opportunities, including fishing, hiking, hunting, and horseback riding. The nearest lake to Matlock is Lake Nahwatzel.  Every year during the first full weekend in May, Matlock hosts the Old Timers' Fair at Mary M. Knight School campus. The fair features food, crafts and tractors. Matlock is located northwest of Olympia, Washington, about a 20-minute drive from the county seat, Shelton. Matlock is a secluded little town just outside of Shelton and Elma. Matlock is also home to Mason County Fire District 12.

Climate
Matlock has high annual precipitation  due to strong influence from the nearby Pacific. A significant drying trend occurs in summer, giving Matlock a warm-summer Mediterranean climate (Csb) according to the Köppen climate classification system.

References

External links
Matlock page of official Mason County Tourism website

Unincorporated communities in Washington (state)
Unincorporated communities in Mason County, Washington